Wingrove is a surname. Notable people with the surname include:

Billy Wingrove, English freestyle footballer
David Wingrove (born 1954), English writer
Elsie Wingrove (1923–2016), Canadian baseball player
Francis Wingrove (1863–1892), Australian cricketer
Gerald Wingrove, English writer
Nigel Wingrove (born 1957), English film director
Rixon Wingrove (born 2000), Australian baseball player